Two magazine titles have been published by Titan Magazines in the United Kingdom for fans of the television series Buffy the Vampire Slayer and its spin-off Angel. Buffy the Vampire Slayer Magazine commenced publication in 1999. Angel Magazine had a limited run of 24 issues and was published between September 2003 and July 2005. Buffy the Vampire Slayer Magazine incorporated Angel Magazine from #76 (August 2005), and was renamed Buffy the Vampire Slayer Magazine incorporating Angel Magazine. It went bi-monthly in 2006, and the final issue was #94 (June/July 2007).

Issues
The contents listed below are intended as a general reference and are not exhaustive. Many regular features such as the 'News' section, quizzes, Q&As, and posters are not detailed here. Furthermore, the reviews listed below in the reviews section disclude Buffy/Angel episode/DVD reviews.

KEY: In the reviews section, '(None)' signifies no reviews were present, whilst '-' signifies that reviews were present but only of episodes/DVDs.

Buffy the Vampire Slayer

Angel

Buffy the Vampire Slayer, incorporating Angel

External links
Official magazine website

Buffyverse
Defunct science fiction magazines published in the United Kingdom
Monthly magazines published in the United Kingdom
Speculative fiction magazines published in the United Kingdom
Titan Magazines titles
Magazines established in 1997
Bi-monthly magazines published in the United Kingdom
Magazines disestablished in 2007